Ibrahim Amadou (born 6 April 1993) is a French professional footballer. Primarily a defensive midfielder, he also plays as a centre-back.

Club career

Nancy
Born in Douala, Cameroon, Amadou moved to France at age 4 and lived in Colombes, where he played at local club AS Cheminots de l'Ouest. He then spent four years at Racing Club de France, before joining the Nancy academy in 2008.

Amadou made his professional debut on 26 May 2013, playing one minute in the last matchday of the Ligue 1 season against Stade Brestois. On 8 August 2014, he scored his first goal against Orléans in Ligue 2.

Lille
On 16 July 2015, Amadou signed a four-year contract with Lille for a reported fee of €2 million. He started in the first match of the 2015–16 Ligue 1 season against Paris Saint-Germain on 7 August 2015, playing in the heart of defense alongside Renato Civelli as Lille suffered a 1–0 defeat. He scored his first goal for the club in the 2–1 win over Bastia on 12 March 2016.

At the start of the 2017–18 season, manager Marcelo Bielsa appointed Amadou as club captain. On 13 August 2017, he took over the goalkeeping role in the 3–0 loss to Strasbourg, following the sending off of Mike Maignan.

Sevilla
On 2 July 2018, Amadou joined Spanish La Liga side Sevilla on a four-year deal.

On 7 August 2019, Amadou joined Norwich City on a season-long loan, with an option to buy the following summer.

On 31 January 2020, Amadou's loan to Norwich was terminated, and he joined Leganés until the end of the season.

On 5 October 2020, Amadou joined French club Angers on loan.

Metz 
On 13 January 2022, Amadou signed for French club Metz on a contract until the end of the 2021–22 season. An option for a further two seasons was included in the deal.

Return to Angers 
On 1 September 2022, Amadou returned to Angers on a one-year contract.

International career
Amadou was born in Cameroon and raised in France. He is a French youth international, and was called up to the senior Cameroon national team, whom he rejected.

Career statistics

Honours 
Lille

 Coupe de la Ligue runner-up: 2015–16

References

External links
 
 
 

Living people
1993 births
Footballers from Douala
Cameroonian footballers
French footballers
France youth international footballers
Association football defenders
AS Nancy Lorraine players
Lille OSC players
Sevilla FC players
Norwich City F.C. players
CD Leganés players
Angers SCO players
FC Metz players
Ligue 1 players
Ligue 2 players
La Liga players
Premier League players
Cameroonian expatriate footballers
French expatriate footballers
Expatriate footballers in England
Expatriate footballers in Spain
Cameroonian expatriate sportspeople in England
Cameroonian expatriate sportspeople in Spain
French expatriate sportspeople in England
French expatriate sportspeople in Spain
Cameroonian emigrants to France
Outfield association footballers who played in goal